Plutella haasi is a species of moth belonging to the family Plutellidae.

It is native to Europe and Northern America.

References

Plutellidae
Moths described in 1883